The Run To The Rose is an Australian Turf Club Group 2 Thoroughbred  horse race for three-year-olds, at set weights with penalties, over a distance of 1200 metres, at Rosehill Racecourse, Sydney, Australia in September. Prizemoney is A$250,000.

History
Prizemoney was increased in 2015 from $125,000 to $175,000.

Name
2003–2004 - Monakea 3YO Quality Handicap
 2005 - Smithfield RSL Club Handicap

Distance
2003–2010 – 1300 metres
2011 onwards - 1200 metres

Grade
2003–2006 - Listed Race
2007–2014 - Group 3
 2015 onwards - Group 2

Venue
 2021 - Kembla Grange Racecourse

Winners

 2022 - In Secret
 2021 - Anamoe
 2020 - Rothfire
 2019 - Bivouac
 2018 - Lean Mean Machine
 2017 - Menari
 2016 - Astern
 2015 - Exosphere
 2014 - Hallowed Crown
 2013 - Va Pensiero
 2012 - Pierro
 2011 - Smart Missile
 2010 - Squamosa
 2009 - Denman
 2008 - Desuetude
 2007 - El Cambio
 2006 - Mentality
 2005 - Paratroopers
 2004 - Eremein
 2003 - Gilded Youth

See also
 List of Australian Group races
 Group races

External links 
Run to the Rose (ATC)

References

Horse races in Australia